Einar Bache (23 September 1897 – 24 June 1976) was a Danish tennis player. He competed in the men's singles and doubles events at the 1924 Summer Olympics.

References

External links
 

1897 births
1976 deaths
Danish male tennis players
Olympic tennis players of Denmark
Tennis players at the 1924 Summer Olympics
Sportspeople from Frederiksberg
20th-century Danish people